Day's shrew (Suncus dayi) is a species of mammal in the family Soricidae. It is endemic to India.  Its natural habitat is subtropical or tropical dry forests. It is threatened by habitat loss.

References

Sources
 CBSG CAMP Workshop, India 2000.  Suncus dayi.   2006 IUCN Red List of Threatened Species.   Downloaded on 30 July 2007.

Day's shrew
Mammals of India
Endemic fauna of India
Fauna of South India
Day's shrew
Taxonomy articles created by Polbot